David George Findlay (27 March 1913 – 6 April 1982) was a Surinamese politician, editor, and writer. He was the owner and chief editor of the newspaper De West.

Biography 
Findlay was born on 27 March 1913 in Paramaribo as David George Albert Findlay. He left for the Netherlands Antilles to work for Royal Dutch Shell, and later became a teacher at the MULO in Aruba.

, owner of De West persuaded Findlay to return to Suriname, and become a newspaper editor. Findlay returned in September 1943. In 1947, Kraan retired, and Findlay bought the newspaper.

Politics 
Findlay was first elected to the Estates of Suriname in 1946. In 1950, Lou Lichtveld had fired doctor  over alleged irregularities which were later proven false. Findlay demanded the resignation of Lichtveld. The matter cumulated in the downfall of the government in 1951.

After a schism in the National Party of Suriname (NPS), Findlay left the NPS, and founded the Surinaamse Democratische Partij (SDP). In 1955, he was re-elected as part of the Unity Front. In 1958, the National Party of Suriname made a comeback, and Findlay had to wait until 1963 to be re-elected. In 1969, he retired from politics.

Coup d'etat 
On 25 February 1980, Dési Bouterse led a coup d'état to overthrow the government of Henck Arron. During the coup, a hand grenade was thrown into the offices of De West, and the building was under fire. Fortunately the fighting only caused minor damage, but it frightened Findlay. Later, the paper was forced to close.

Death 
Findlay died on 6 April 1982 in Paramaribo at the age of 69.

Bibliography

References 

1913 births
1982 deaths
Members of the National Assembly (Suriname)
People from Paramaribo
Surinamese male writers
Surinamese politicians